The  is a ruined Genoese tower located in the commune of Ajaccio on the west coast of Corsica. Only part of the tower survives.

The tower was built in the second half of the 16th century. It was one of a series of coastal defences constructed by the Republic of Genoa between 1530 and 1620 to stem the attacks by Barbary pirates.

The Conservatoire du littoral, a French government agency responsible for the protection of outstanding natural areas on the coast, has announced that it intends to purchase the Capu di Fenu headland and the adjacent coastline. As of 2017 it had acquired .

See also
List of Genoese towers in Corsica

References

Towers in Corsica
Torra di Capu di Fenu
Buildings and structures in Corse-du-Sud
Tourist attractions in Corse-du-Sud